The 1992 Irish general election to the 27th Dáil was held on Wednesday, 25 November, almost three weeks after the dissolution of the 26th Dáil on 5 November by President Mary Robinson, on the request of Taoiseach Albert Reynolds following a defeat of the government in a motion of confidence. The general election took place in 41 Dáil constituencies throughout Ireland for 166 seats in Dáil Éireann, the house of representatives of the Oireachtas, under a revision in the Electoral (Amendment) Act 1990. Three referendums on abortion were held on the same date.

The 27th Dáil met at Leinster House on 14 December 1992 to nominate the Taoiseach for appointment by the president and to approve the appointment of a new government of Ireland. No government was formed on that date, but on 12 January 1993, Reynolds was re-appointed Taoiseach, forming the 23rd Government of Ireland, a coalition government of Fianna Fáil and the Labour Party.

Campaign
 
The general election of 1992 was precipitated by the collapse of the Fianna Fáil–Progressive Democrats coalition government. Allegations of dishonesty at the Beef Tribunal forced Desmond O'Malley and his party to part ways with Albert Reynolds's Fianna Fáil. Both Albert Reynolds and John Bruton of Fine Gael were fighting their first general election as leader of their respective parties. For Reynolds it would be his only election as leader. The campaign went very poorly for Fianna Fáil with Reynolds's support dropping by 20%.

On the left, the Labour Party had increased their support in the local elections the previous year and many were predicting major gains for the party in the Dáil. The Workers' Party had split at a special convention that year over a motion to re-constitute the party, similar to the move made the same year by the Italian Communist Party, and sever all links with the Official IRA. Six out of their seven TDs and a majority of their councillors left the party when the motion failed to be passed and formed Democratic Left in early 1992.

Many political pundits had predicted that Fianna Fáil would not be re-elected and that a "Rainbow Coalition" involving Fine Gael, the Labour Party and possibly Democratic Left would be formed. John Bruton, the leader of Fine Gael, had problems of his own. Opinion polls showed that if a "Rainbow Coalition" came to power, Dick Spring of the Labour Party was seen as a better potential Taoiseach than Bruton. The possibility of a rotating Taoiseach was also hinted at in the media.

The big winner of the campaign was Dick Spring and the Labour Party. They distanced themselves completely from Fine Gael and fought an independent line. During the campaign Spring made very little comment about what the party would do after the election, however, he did say that if the Labour Party was part of a coalition he would have to be granted a turn as Taoiseach.

The election also saw Moosajee Bhamjee (Labour Party) become the first Muslim Teachta Dála (TD).

Results

|}

In 1989 the Democratic Socialist Party won 0.6% of the vote and 1 seat; the party merged with the Labour Party in 1990. Independents include Independent Fianna Fáil (5,248 votes, 1 seat).

Voting summary

Seats summary

Government formation

Fianna Fáil had its worst performance since 1927, winning less than 40% of the vote. Fine Gael, in spite of predictions of success, lost 10 seats. The Labour Party recorded its best ever result, an event dubbed the "Spring Tide" and more than doubled its number of seats. Talks between Fine Gael and Labour on establishing a minority government floundered after several weeks, partly over the issue of the "revolving Taoiseach". Spring had to enter into coalition with Fianna Fáil, or force another election. The coalition deal proved very unpopular with many of Labour's supporters, because Dick Spring had campaigned heavily against Fianna Fáil and particularly Albert Reynolds. As a result of the coalition, Albert Reynolds was elected Taoiseach with over 100 votes, the biggest majority by any Taoiseach until 2011.

Following a number of scandals in 1994, particularly over the beef industry, the Labour Party left the coalition and, after negotiations, formed the Rainbow Coalition with Fine Gael and Democratic Left on 15 December 1994, as three by-election gains had by then made a Fine Gael-Labour-Democratic Left majority government possible. This was the first and to date, the only, time a new government with new coalition parties took office within a Dáil term.

Dáil membership changes
The following changes took place as a result of the election: 
11 outgoing TDs retired
155 TDs stood for re-election
126 of those were re-elected
30 failed to be re-elected
41 successor TDs were elected
33 were elected for the first time
8 had previously been TDs
There were 10 successor female TDs, increasing the total number by 7 to 20
There were changes in 29 of the 41 constituencies contested

Outgoing TDs are listed in the constituency they contested in the election. For some, such as John Stafford, this differs from the constituency they represented in the outgoing Dáil. Where more than one change took place in a constituency the concept of successor is an approximation for presentation only.

See also
Members of the 20th Seanad

Notes

References

Further reading

External links
1992 election: Party leaders' debate RTÉ archives 

General election, 1992
1992 in Irish politics
1992
27th Dáil
November 1992 events in Europe